This is a list of business schools in Africa.

Algeria
 Management Institute of Algiers (IMAA)

Cameroon
Faculty of Economics and Management Science | University of Bamenda (public)
Faculty of Social and Management Sciences | University of Buea (public)
University of Dschang (public)
Ecole Superieure Des Sciences Economiques Et Commerciales (ESSEC), University of Doula (public)
Higher Institute of Professional Studies (HIPS) - Buea (private)
Catholic University Institute of Buea
Yaounde Business School, Yaounde
Higher Institute for Professional Development and Training- (HIPDET) Bamenda

Cape Verde
ISCEE Cape Verde Business School (ISCEE), Praia/Mindelo

Ghana
University of Ghana Business School, Accra
Central University College, Accra
Ghana Institute of Management and Public Administration (GIMPA), Accra
KNUST School of Business, Kumasi
Accra Business School
Sunyani Polytechnic School of Management, Sunyani
University of Cape Coast School of Business, Cape Coast
University of Professional Studies, Accra - U.P.S.A, Legon
Valley View University, Oyibi, Accra
Zenith University College, School of Business, Labadi, Trade Fair-Accra
African Graduate School of Management and Leadership, Kanda, Accra 
Nobel International Business School, Accra

Kenya
Africa Nazarene University
Chuka University
Daystar University
Dedan Kimathi University of Technology
Egerton University
Great Lakes University of Kisumu
Jaramogi Oginga Odinga University of Science and Technology
Kabarak University
Karatina University
KCA University
Kenya Methodist University
Kenyatta University
Kenyatta University – Machakos University College
Kibabii University
Kisii University
Laikipia University
Maasai Mara University
Maseno University
Masinde Muliro University of Science and Technology
Meru University of Science and Technology
Moi University
Moi University – Rongo University College
Mount Kenya University
Presbyterian University of East Africa
Pwani University
Scott Theological College
South Eastern Kenya University
St Paul's University
Strathmore University
The Catholic University of Eastern Africa
The Pan Africa Christian University
The Technical University of Kenya
United States International University
University of Eastern Africa, Baraton
University of Eldoret
University of Kabianga
University of Nairobi
University of Nairobi – Embu University College

Mauritius

Morocco
ESCA SCHOOL OF MANAGEMENT
 National School of Business and Management in Settat
 ISCAE
 Al Akhawayn School Of Business Administration (SBA)
 Sup de Co Marrakech

Namibia
Harold Pupkewitz Graduate School of Business, Windhoek
Namibia Business School, at the University of Namibia, Windhoek

Nigeria
African Business School (ABS), Abuja
Dangote Business School, Bayero University, Kano
Business School Netherlands, Lagos Nigeria
Beeches Graduate School of Business, Lagos
Bowell Business School, Lagos & Akure
The Delta Business School, Warri
ESUTH Business School, Lagos
Fate Foundation, Lagos
GPE Business School, Enugu
Integrated Business School (IBS), Kaduna
Kaduna Business School, Kaduna
MSME Business School, Abuja & Owerri
Obafemi Awolowo University Business School, Ife
 Pan-African University, Lagos]] - Lagos Business School (LBS), Lagos
 Unicaribbean Business School Nigeria - [Lagos, Abuja, Port-Harcourt, Akure, Delta State] (UBS)www.unicaribbeanedu.ng  
University of Ilorin Business School, Ilorin
University of Lagos Business School, Lagos
Unizik Business School, Nnamdi Azikiwe University Awka
Warri Business School (WBS), Warri
West Africa Business School (WABS) Lagos;  Accra, Ghana
Poma International Business Academy (PIBA), Lagos
Expert Business School (EBS), Lagos
 Garden City Premier Business School (GCPBS), Port Harcourt.

Rwanda
Kigali Institute of Science and Technology

South Africa

Tanzania
East & Southern African Management Institute
Business School of Africa
Tanzania Business School (TBS), Morogoro
UDSM Business School, Dar es Salaam
University of Dodoma
Mzumbe University
College of Business Education
Iringa University
Mwenge Catholic University

Tunisia
Avicenne Private Business School, Tunis
Institut des Hautes Etudes Commerciales, Carthage
Institut des Hautes Etudes Commerciales, Sousse
Mediterranean School of Business, Tunis
Université Tunis Carthage, Soukra
Tunis Business School, El Mourouj, Ben Arous Governorate

Uganda

See also 
Lists of business school, other continents
 List of business schools in Australia
 List of business schools in Asia
 List of business schools in Europe
 List of business schools in the United States

References

 
Africa
Business school